Susan Tanui (born March 1987) is an American long-distance runner. She competed at distances as short as 1500 m to 10,000 m and cross country in college. She also ran 5 km and half marathon events.

NCAA
During her collegiate career at University of Alaska Anchorage, Tanui was the 2012 and 2013 NCAA D2 Outdoor Championships runner up taking second in the 3,000-meter steeplechase. She also had All Region as well as All-America placings in NCAA competition in cross country running and indoor track (3000 m and 5000 m). In April 2014, she was enlisted to serve in the U.S. Army.

Professional life

Tanui initiated the 2018's season by winning 6th place at the USA Cross Country Championships which was led by Emily Infeld in 33:18.7 (3:19.9/km), Molly Seidel in 33:22.1, Stephanie Bruce in 33:34.1, her teammate Courtney Frerichs 33:55.1, Emily Durgin in 33:56.9, and Susan Tanui in 34:39.0 and the six qualified for Team USA at 2018 NACAC Cross Country Championships in La Libertad, El Salvador on February 17, 2018 where she placed 4th Top leading American woman.

References

External links

 Susan Tanui profile from Association of Road Racing Statisticians

Living people
1987 births
Kenyan female long-distance runners
Kenyan female middle-distance runners
Kenyan female steeplechase runners
Kenyan female cross country runners
People from Uasin Gishu County